Kathrine Olldag (born 20 December 1972 in Aabenraa) is a Danish politician, who is a member of the Folketing for the Social Liberal Party. She was elected into parliament at the 2019 Danish general election.

Political career
Olldag was elected into parliament at the 2019 election, where she received 1,595 personal votes.

References

External links 
 Biography on the website of the Danish Parliament (Folketinget)

1972 births
Living people
People from Aabenraa Municipality
Danish Social Liberal Party politicians
21st-century Danish women politicians
Women members of the Folketing
Members of the Folketing 2019–2022